Ernest Juvara (May 5, 1870, Bârlad, Vaslui County – May 5, 1933, Bucharest) was a Romanian physician, innovative in surgical and instrumental techniques. He was a professor at the Faculty of Medicine of the University of Bucharest, with contributions in the field of bone prostheses, intestinal anastomoses and spinal anesthesia.

He went to high school in Bucharest, after which he studied at the Faculty of Medicine of the University of Paris from 1888 to 1895.

Publications

References 

People from Bârlad
Romanian surgeons
Academic staff of the Carol Davila University of Medicine and Pharmacy
1933 deaths
1870 births
University of Paris alumni
Romanian medical writers
20th-century Romanian physicians